William Dolben was a Welsh clergyman.

William Dolben may also refer to:

William Dolben (judge) (c. 1627–1694), English judge
Sir William Dolben, 3rd Baronet (1727–1814), British MP and campaigner for the abolition of slavery
William H. Dolben (1878–1948), American politician in Massachusetts

See also
Dolben (surname)